A kestros  or kestrophendone, respectively Latinized as cestrus or cestrosphendone, is a specially designed sling that is used to throw a heavy dart.

History
The kestros is mentioned in the writings of Livy and Polybius. It seems to have been invented around 168 BC. and was employed by some of the Macedonian troops of king Perseus of Macedon during the Third Macedonian war. The description is quite confusing:

The exact construction of the kestrosphendone remains somewhat mysterious. However, experimental reconstructions based on the available information have resulted in quite spectacular results. Nonetheless, the kestrosphendone did not stand the test of time and seems to have been abandoned quite quickly. The fundamental purpose of this weapon seems to have been to develop a sling shot with the penetrative power of a point. If so, then a lighter version of this weapon, the plumbata, persisted into late antiquity. In this weapon, the wooden shaft gave nearly the same mechanical advantage as a sling. In effect, each sling bolt came with a one-time sling.

Another way of obtaining a one time sling was to fix a string to a slingstone made of lead. There is evidence for this variation at the Battle of Fucine Lake in 89 BC.

References

Throwing weapons
Projectile weapons
Ancient weapons
Ancient Greek military terminology
Ancient Greek military equipment